Penagos is a Spanish surname. Notable people with the surname include:

 Oscar Penagos (born 1964), Colombian weightlifter
 Rafael de Penagos (1889–1954), Spanish illustrator and painter
 Sergio Penagos (born 1969), Mexican politician

Spanish-language surnames